Galen Von Bodenhausen (born 1961) is an American social psychologist. He is the Lawyer Taylor Professor of Psychology in the Weinberg College of Arts & Sciences at Northwestern University, where he is also a professor of marketing in the Kellogg School of Management. He is known for his research on gender stereotypes, gender roles, and implicit biases.

References

External links
Faculty page

Living people
American social psychologists
Northwestern University faculty
Wright State University alumni
University of Illinois Urbana-Champaign alumni
1961 births
American psychologists